Francis Compton D.C.L (20 November 1824 – 24 October 1915) was an English lawyer and Conservative Party politician.

Biography 
Compton was the son of Henry Combe Compton M.P. of Minstead Manor House, Lyndhurst, Hampshire and his wife Charlotte Mills.  He was educated at Merton College, Oxford and became a Fellow of All Souls. He was called to the bar at Lincoln's Inn and Middle Temple in 1850. He was a J.P. for Hampshire.

At the 1880 general election Compton was elected as Member of Parliament (MP) for South Hampshire. When this was divided under the Redistribution of Seats Act 1885, he was elected at the 1885 general election as MP for the New Forest, and held the seat until he retired from the House of Commons at the 1892 election.

Compton lived at Manor House, Minstead, Lyndhurst and died at the age of 90. His son Henry Francis Compton was later MP for New Forest. His sister Catherine married Admiral Sir Henry Codrington.

Cricket
Compton played first-class cricket for Hampshire as well as for the Marylebone Cricket Club and the Gentlemen of the South.

References

External links 
 

1824 births
1915 deaths
Alumni of Merton College, Oxford
Conservative Party (UK) MPs for English constituencies
English cricketers
Fellows of All Souls College, Oxford
Gentlemen of the South cricketers
Hampshire cricketers
Marylebone Cricket Club cricketers
UK MPs 1880–1885
UK MPs 1885–1886
UK MPs 1886–1892